The 2009–10 RIT Tigers men's ice hockey season was the Tigers' 45th season of varsity hockey and fifth at the NCAA Division I level. They represented Rochester Institute of Technology in the 2009–10 NCAA Division I men's ice hockey season. The team was coached by Wayne Wilson in his eleventh season as the program's head coach and played most of their home games at the Frank Ritter Memorial Ice Arena. One home game was played at the Blue Cross Arena in downtown Rochester, New York.

The season was highlighted by the Tigers' first Atlantic Hockey tournament title, first Division I NCAA tournament appearance, victories over Denver and New Hampshire to win the East Regional, and the team's first Frozen Four appearance.

The team was the Chairman's Choice for induction into the Frontier Field Walk of Fame in 2010, in recognition of their Frozen Four berth.

The Rochester Red Wings honored the RIT Men’s Hockey team at Frontier Field on May 17, 2010. Any fans who wore RIT gear received $1 off the purchase of their tickets. As part of a pre-game ceremony, Head Coach Wayne Wilson and RIT President Bill Destler were on hand to accept a key to the city and a proclamation from Monroe County Executive Maggie Brooks. RIT captain Dan Ringwald threw out the ceremonial first pitch.

In 2011, RIT's University News service received the 'Best In Show' PRism award from the Rochester chapter of the Public Relations Society of America for its coverage of the team's Frozen Four appearance.

Standings

Roster 

* Player left team.Source: RIT Athletics

Preseason

Regular season

Schedule 
  Green background indicates win (2 points).
  Red background indicates loss (0 points).
  White background indicates tie (1 point).

Postseason

Player stats

Skaters 
Note: GP = Games played; G = Goals (Shorthanded); A = Assists; Pts = Points; +/- = Plus-minus; PIM = Penalty minutes

 † Denotes player left team.
 (G) Denotes goaltender.

 (G) Denotes goaltender.

Goaltenders 
Note: GP = Games played; TOI = Time on ice; GAA = Goals against average; W = Wins; L = Losses; T = Ties; SO = Shutouts; SA = Shots Against; GA = Goals against; SV% = Save percentage

See also 
 2009–10 NCAA Division I men's ice hockey season

References

External links 
 RIT Tigers men's ice hockey

RIT Tigers men's ice hockey seasons
RIT
RIT Tigers
RIT Tigers
RIT
RIT